Egon Nuter (born on 23 September 1955 in Tallinn) is an Estonian actor.

In 1980 he graduated from Tallinn Pedagogical Institute in stage managing speciality. From 1980 until 2002, he worked at the Vanalinnastuudio. Since 2019, he has been an actor at the Tallinn City Theatre. Besides theatre roles he has played also in several films.

Filmography

 1983: Nipernaadi
 1984: Hundiseaduse aegu
 1991: Surmatants
1996: Õnne 13
 1997: Minu Leninid 
 1998: Kallis härra Q 
 2008: Tuulepealne maa
 2010: Lumekuninganna
 2010: Ühikarotid
 2013: Elavad pildid
 2016: Drömspel: Dream Game
 2017: Green Cats
 2018: Põrgu Jaan 
 2018: Võta või jäta
 2019: ENSV 
 2019: Lotte ja kadunud lohed (animated film; in the role Kalmer (voice))
 2019: Dora Who Came from Highway
 2020: Asjad, millest me ei räägi
 2020: Julius (short film)
 2022:  Kiik, Kirves ja Igavese Armastuse Puu
 2022: Mieheni vaimo

References

External links 

 

Living people
1955 births
Estonian male stage actors
Estonian male film actors
Estonian male television actors
Estonian male voice actors
20th-century Estonian male actors
21st-century Estonian male actors
Tallinn University alumni
Male actors from Tallinn